Gardena insignis is a thread-legged bug species from the genus Gardena. It is found in Central Europe, including Slovenia.

References

Reduviidae
Hemiptera of Europe
Insects described in 1887